Doomsday 2000 may refer to:

 The Year 2000 problem
 Doomsday 2000 (video game), a roguelike game